The 2018–19 Southern Jaguars basketball team represents Southern University during the 2018–19 NCAA Division I men's basketball season. The Jaguars, led by head coach Sean Woods, play their home games at the F. G. Clark Center in Baton Rouge, Louisiana as members of the Southwestern Athletic Conference.

Previous season 
The Jaguars finished the 2017–18 season 15–18, 10–8 in SWAC play to finish in fifth place. Due to Grambling State's Academic Progress Rate violations and subsequent postseason ineligibility, the Jaguars received the No. 4 seed in the SWAC tournament. They defeated Jackson State in the quarterfinals before losing to Arkansas–Pine Bluff in  the semifinals.

On April 12, 2018, Southern hired Stetson assistant coach and former Morehead State/Mississippi Valley State head coach Sean Woods for the full-time job.

Roster

Schedule and results

|-
!colspan=9 style=|Non-conference regular season
|-
!colspan=9 style=|SWAC regular season
|-
!colspan=9 style=|SWAC tournament

References 

Southern Jaguars basketball seasons
Southern
Southern
Southern